U Vimala (27 December 1899 - 17 October 1962), commonly known as the Mogok Sayadaw, was a renowned bhikkhu and vipassanā meditation master of Theravada Buddhism.

Early life

He was born Maung Hla Baw to Daw Shwe Ake and U Aung Tun in a small village close to Amarapura in Mandalay Province, Burma on 27 December 1899. Hla Baw began his education at 4, and enrolled as a samanera or novitiate at age 9 under U Jagara. He later left for Mingala Makuna Monastery at Amarapura to continue his religious studies.

Monkhood
In 1920, he was ordained as a bhikkhu (monk) in the tradition of Burmese Buddhism with the dharma name  which means "stainless, Undefiled." As his monkhood was sponsored by the residents of Mogok, a town well known for rubies and gems, Vimala became known as "Mogok". In 1924, Vimala became the chief abbot of Pikara Monastery. He began to give sermons focusing on abhidhamma and teaching vipassana meditation.
He attained Nirvana by practicing meditation for four years and became an Arhat. Then, he disseminated his method to the pupils for attaining Nirvana. He focused on the insight learning of the dynamic nature of mind and materials in his teaching. His teaching audio recordings are still available and learnt by Myanmar Buddhists to learn meditation methods.

Legacy
U Vimala established the Mogok tradition of vipassana meditation, which is independent of the meditation traditions established by his Burmese predecessors, Ledi Sayadaw and Mahasi Sayadaw. U Vimala stressed dependent origination and cittanupassana as part of meditation practice. There are currently over 300 meditation centers in Burma that teach his form of meditation.

See also
Buddhism
Theravada
Vipassanā

References

Further reading 
 Seeking the Heart of Wisdom: The Path of Insight Meditation. Joseph Goldstein & Jack Kornfield (2001< Reissue) Shambhala. 
 Beyond the Breath: Extraordinary Mindfulness Through Whole-Body Vipassana. (2002) Marshall Glickman. Tuttle Publishing. .
 Journey to the Center: A Meditation Workbook. Matthew Flickstein and Bhante Henepola Gunaratana. (1998) Wisdom Publications. .
 In this Very Life Sayadaw U Pandita, In this Very Life
 The Anapanasati Sutta: A practical guide to mindfulness of breathing and tranquil wisdom meditation. Sayadaw Gyi Vimalaramsi(2006) (PDF)

1899 births
1962 deaths
Burmese Buddhist monks
Buddhist organizations
People from Mandalay Region
20th-century Buddhist monks
Burmese recipients of Agga Maha Pandita